Rhinconichthys is an extinct genus of bony fish which existed during the Cenomanian stage of the Late Cretaceous.

Along with its close cousins the great-white-shark-sized or larger Bonnerichthys and the immense Leedsichthys, Rhinconichthys forms a line of giant filter-feeding bony pachycormid fish that swam the Jurassic and Cretaceous seas for over 100 million years.

Description
Rhinconichthys was a medium-sized fish.

References

Pachycormiformes
Fossil taxa described in 2010
Cretaceous fish of Europe
Cretaceous fish of Asia